HD 34255, also known HR 1720, is a star located in the northern circumpolar constellation Camelopardalis, the giraffe. It has an apparent magnitude of 5.60, allowing it to be faintly visible to the naked eye.

This is a solitary, evolved red supergiant with a stellar classification of K4 I. It has 6.9 times the mass of the Sun and is said to be 46 million years old. The star's metallicity – what astronomers dub as elements heavier than helium – is around solar level.

References

K-type supergiants
Camelopardalis (constellation)
034255
024914
BD+62 00742
1720